"Moonchild" is the fourth track from British progressive rock band King Crimson's debut album, In the Court of the Crimson King.

Along with songs by Yes, this song was used in the 1998 movie Buffalo '66, in the scene in which Christina Ricci tap dances at the bowling alley.

After having been rehearsed in 2013–2014 by King Crimson VIII, the song made its live debut after 48 years on 18 October 2017 in Austin, Texas.

Composition 
The first section, "The Dream", is a mellotron-driven ballad, but after two and a half minutes it changes to a completely free-form instrumental improvisation by the band (called "The Illusion"), which lasts until the end of the song. Robert Fripp plays a snippet of "The Surrey With the Fringe on Top" (from Rodgers & Hammerstein's "Oklahoma!") in this section. In the 2009 remastered version of the album, the track was edited by Fripp and colleague Steven Wilson, with around 2.30 minutes of the original improvisation (the reference by Fripp to "The Surrey With the Fringe on Top") being removed. This issue of the album does, however, offer the original version as a bonus track.

The song contains drummer Michael Giles performing a unique alternation between the ride cymbals, which was praised by music critics and writers. The song was described as a "space jam."

Personnel
Robert Fripp – electric guitar
Michael Giles – drums, percussion
Ian McDonald – Mellotron, vibraphone
Greg Lake – vocals, bass
Peter Sinfield – lyrics

Covers
 British rock band Doves used the melody from this song for their track "M62 Song". 
 Rapper MIMS samples the song in his track "Doctor Doctor".
 "Moonchild" has also been interpreted by the Italian psychedelic progressive rock band Twenty Four Hours on the album The Smell of The Rainy Air, in 1991

References

Sources

1969 songs
Songs with lyrics by Peter Sinfield
King Crimson songs
Rock ballads
Songs written by Robert Fripp
Songs written by Ian McDonald (musician)
Songs written by Greg Lake
Songs written by Michael Giles
Song recordings produced by Greg Lake
Song recordings produced by Ian McDonald (musician)

he:In the Court of the Crimson King#Moonchild